Wauhillau is a census-designated place (CDP) in Adair County, Oklahoma, United States. The population was 345 at the 2010 census.

Geography
Oklahoma State Highway 51 forms the northeastern edge of the CDP.

Demographics

References

Census-designated places in Adair County, Oklahoma
Census-designated places in Oklahoma